The Hungarian–Czechoslovak War, or Northern Campaign, was fought between the Hungarian Soviet Republic and the First Czechoslovak Republic from April to June 1919.

Background

At the end of 1918, the final year of World War I, the collapse of Austria-Hungary led to the declaration of independence of Czechoslovakia. The newly-proclaimed state wanted to ensure the success of their territorial demands and started an attack.

During the war, the Hungarian Red Army fought separate battles against troops from Czechoslovakia and Romania, and France was also highly involved diplomatically in the conflicts, too. By the war's final stage, more than 120,000 troops on both sides had become involved.

Appealing to Hungarians with promises of regaining the land lost to neighbouring countries within a week of his rise to power, Béla Kun declared war upon Czechoslovakia, which would increase his domestic support by making good on his promise to restore Hungary's borders. The Hungarian army recruited men aged between 19 and 25. Industrial workers from Budapest volunteered, and many former Austro-Hungarian officers re-enlisted through patriotism. The Hungarian army moved its 1st and 5th artillery divisions (40 battalions) to Upper Hungary (partially modern day Slovakia). The Hungarian counterattack launched on May 9, 1919 in the area of Hatvan. On May 20, 1919, Colonel Aurél Stromfeld, attacked in force and routed Czechoslovak troops from Miskolc (Miškovec), also recapturing Košice and Prešov (Eperjes), thus successfully separated the Czechoslovak and Romanian Armies from each other. Through that successful action, Hungary controlled territory up to its old northern borders and regained control of industrial areas around Miskolc, Salgótarján and Banská Štiavnica (Selmecbánya).

Proclamation of Slovak Soviet Republic and the moral collapse of army
Despite communist promises on the restoration of the former borders of Hungary, the communist declared the establishment of the Slovak Soviet Republic in Prešov on 16 June 1919. After the proclamation of the Slovak Soviet Republic, the Hungarian nationalists and patriots soon realized that the new communist government had no intentions to recapture the lost territories, only to spread communist ideology and establish other communist states in Europe, and was thus sacrificing Hungarian national interests. Despite the series of military victories against the Czechoslovak army, the Hungarian Red Army started to disintegrate because of the fundamental tension between patriots and communists during the establishment of the Independent Slovak Soviet Republic, and that concession shook the popular and military support of the communist government, particularly among professional military officers, patriots and nationalists in the Hungarian Red Army. Even the chief of the general staff Aurél Stromfeld, in fact, resigned his post in protest.

Combat turnaround
Meanwhile, the Czechoslovak Army had changed. The few unreliable Italian commanders were replaced by French generals and officers. The head of the newly organized Czechoslovak 2nd Infantry Division was the French Legion Colonel and veteran Foreign Legion Josef Šnejdárek. Battalions and regiments broken in previous battles were formed and, along with new units, receded in mountainous terrain from one defensive line to another. It was enough for a week for Šnejdárek to consolidate subordinate troops and prepare them for offensive actions.

Battle of Zvolen (Zólyom)
The rest of the soldiers and weapons cleaning at the time of the fighting against the Hungarian Red Army - May 1919
On the morning of June 10, the 2nd Infantry Brigade launched a demonstration attack on Zvolen (Zólyom). Her left wing surprisingly appeared in the side of the Hungarian troops, the right wing entered Banská Štiavnica (Selmecbánya). All Hungarian attacks the following day were repelled and the 2nd Division continued to attack. Šnejdárek changed the direction of the strike and on June 13 he ordered a by-pass attack on Zvolen. After four hours of fighting, his troops occupied the dominant dimensions and began attacking the key positions of the Hungarian defense. At around noon, the first unit of the Elected and the queue were punched to a depth of 10 kilometers. The whole central flow of Hron (Garam) was given to the Czechoslovak control, and the Hungarian command no longer had advances to break the breakthrough.

Aftermath
The recapture of Zvolen meant a combat turnaround. The Czechoslovak Army took the initiative and attacked the Hungarians in two directions: Levice (Léva) and Lučenec (Losonc). Weekly battles exploded and all Hungarian advances were exhausted. The Hungarian Army Command agreed with the ceasefire and retreated to the demarcation line. The Czech soldiers, most of whom had fought in World War I in the ranks of the Austro-Hungarian Army and Slovak army volunteers, showed that they were as good as Czechoslovak legion who were still in Russia in 1919.

References

Literature 
 Aliaksandr Piahanau, Czechoslovak-Hungarian Border Conflict, In: 1914-1918-online. International Encyclopedia of the First World War, Freie Universität Berlin, Berlin 2018-06-19. DOI: 10.15463/ie1418.11274. https://encyclopedia.1914-1918-online.net/article/czechoslovak-hungarian_border_conflict
 Petr Čornej, Pavel Bělina, Slavné bitvy naší historie, Marsyas 1993

External links 
Aliaksandr Piahanau: Czechoslovak-Hungarian Border Conflict, in: 1914-1918-online. International Encyclopedia of the First World War.
 zabudnutý generál

1918 in Hungary
1919 in Hungary
1918 in Czechoslovakia
1919 in Czechoslovakia
Conflicts in 1918
Conflicts in 1919
Wars involving Hungary
Wars involving Czechoslovakia
Wars between the Czech Republic and Hungary